Bernard Paul may refer to:
 Bernard Paul (director), French film director and screenwriter
 Bernard Paul (boxer), Mauritian/British boxer
 Bernard H. Paul, American puppeteer